Note: This article consists mostly of locomotives operated by the Emu Bay Railway, Tasmanian Government Railways, AN Tasrail and TasRail and the preceding private companies which were amalgamated into the TGR. Locomotives from the Mount Lyell Mining & Railway Company, North East Dundas Tramway are yet to be included.

Steam

Emu Bay Railway
5 G class 4-8-2+2-8-4, purchased second-hand from Queensland Rail and Tasmanian Government Railways

Launceston & Western Railway
4 A class, built by Robert Stephenson & Company
1 A class, built by Sharp, Stewart & Company

Tasmanian Main Line Company
5 E class, built by Hunslet Engine Company
1 A+ class, built by Hunslet Engine Company
1 F class, built by Neilson & Company
3 B+ class, built by Hunslet Engine Company
2 D+ class, built by Dübs & Company
4 C+ class, built by Dübs & Company

Tasmanian Government Railways
1 A class, built in the TGR Workshops, Launceston
8 A class, built by Beyer, Peacock & Company
8 Ab class, built in the TGR Workshops, Launceston
15 B class, built by Beyer, Peacock & Company
28 C class 2-6-0, built by Beyer, Peacock & Company
6 CC class 2-6-0, built in the TGR Workshops, Launceston, modified from C class
4 CCS class 2-6-0, built in the TGR Workshops, Launceston, modified from CC class
5 D class, built by Beyer, Peacock & Company
8 DS class 2-6-4T, ex New Zealand Railways WF class (built by Hillside Workshops, Addington Workshops, A & G Price)
2 E class, built by Beyer, Peacock & Company
4 F class, built by James Martin & Company, purchased second-hand from South Australian Railways in 1948
14 G class 4-8-2+2-8-4, built by Newport Workshops, Islington Railway Workshops, Clyde Engineering
8 H class 4-8-2, built by Vulcan Foundry
2 L class 2-6-2+2-6-2, built by Beyer, Peacock & Company
2 M class (4-4-2+2-4-4), built by Beyer, Peacock & Company
10 M class 4-6-2, built by Robert Stephenson & Hawthorns
4 MA class 4-6-2, built in the TGR Workshops, Launceston, modified from M class
1 P class, built by Clyde Engineering
19 Q class 4-8-2, built by Perry Engineering, Walkers, Clyde Engineering
4 R class 4-6-2, built by Perry Engineering
9 SP class (steam railcars), built by  Sentinel Cammell
6 T class, built by Walkers, purchased second-hand from South Australian Railways in 1920

Ex Public Works Department (Marrawah tram)
Big Ben, 0-6-0 ST type, built by Baldwin Locomotive Works
Fantail, 0-4-0 ST type, built by Baldwin Locomotive Works
Six Wheeler, 0-6-0 ST type, built by Hudswell Clarke
Spider, 0-4-0 WT type, built by Baldwin Locomotive Works

Tasmania Government Railways (2'0" Gauge)
3 G class, built by Sharp, Stewart & Company
4 H class, built by Krauss
1 J class 2-6-4-0T, built by Hagans of Erfurt
2 K class 0-4-0+0-4-0 built by Beyer, Peacock & Company, K1 was the world's first Garratt built

Diesel

Emu Bay Railway
4 Emu Bay Railway 10 class, built by Tulloch and Walkers
7 Emu Bay Railway 11 class, built by Walkers

Tasmanian Government Railways

13 V class (-C-), built by Vulcan Foundry, TGR Workshops
32 X class (Bo-Bo), built by English Electric, first main line diesel-electrics in Australia
6 U class (-B-), built by Malcolm Moore, TGR Workshops
2 W class (-C-), built by Tulloch
5 XA class (Bo-Bo), built in the TGR Workshops, Launceston, modified from X class
8 Y class (Bo-Bo), built by TGR Workshops, English Electric
3 VA class (-C-), built by TGR Launceston Railway Workshops
4 Z class (Co-Co), built by English Electric, Rocklea
6 ZA class (Co-Co), built by English Electric, Rocklea
30 DP class (railcars) (Bo-Bo), built by Drewry Car Company, Tasmanian Government Railways & Waddingtons

AN Tasrail
20 830 class, built by AE Goodwin, Sydney transferred from Australian National, South Australia between 1980 and 1986
16 ZB class, built by English Electric, Rocklea purchased second-hand from Queensland Rail in 19862350/2370 Classes Sunshine Express issue 245 August 1986 page 118
45 ZC class, built by English Electric, Rocklea, purchased second-hand from Queensland Rail in 1988

TasRail
4 2050 class, built by Clyde Engineering, Eagle Farm, purchased second-hand from Aurizon in 2011
17 TasRail TR class, built by Progress Rail, Georgia

References

See also
History of rail transport in Australia
Rail transport in Tasmania
Railways on the West Coast of Tasmania

Locomotives
 
Tasmania
Locomotives
Tas